Admiral of the Fleet John Rushworth Jellicoe, 1st Earl Jellicoe,  (5 December 1859 – 20 November 1935) was a Royal Navy officer. He fought in the Anglo-Egyptian War and the Boxer Rebellion and commanded the Grand Fleet at the Battle of Jutland in May 1916 during the First World War. His handling of the fleet at that battle was controversial. Jellicoe made no serious mistakes and the German High Seas Fleet retreated to port, at a time when defeat would have been catastrophic for Britain, but the public was disappointed that the Royal Navy had not won a more dramatic victory given that they outnumbered the enemy. Jellicoe later served as First Sea Lord, overseeing the expansion of the Naval Staff at the Admiralty and the introduction of convoys, but was relieved at the end of 1917. He also served as the governor-general of New Zealand in the early 1920s.

Early life
Jellicoe was born on 5 December 1859 in Southampton, Hampshire. Jellicoe was the son of John Henry Jellicoe, a captain in the Royal Mail Steam Packet Company, and Lucy Henrietta Jellicoe (née Keele). He was educated at Field House School in Rottingdean and aboard the training ship , which he joined as a naval cadet in 1872. He was made a midshipman in the steam frigate  in September 1874 before transferring to the ironclad  in the Mediterranean Fleet in July 1877. Promoted to sub-lieutenant on 5 December 1878, he joined , flagship of the Mediterranean Fleet, as signal sub-lieutenant in 1880. Promoted to lieutenant on 23 September 1880, he returned to HMS Agincourt in February 1881 and commanded a rifle company of the Naval Brigade at Ismailia during the Egyptian war of 1882.

Early career 
Jellicoe qualified as a gunnery officer in 1883 and was appointed to the staff of the gunnery school  in May 1884. He joined the turret ship  as gunnery officer in September 1885 and was awarded the Board of Trade Silver Medal for rescuing the crew of a capsized steamer near Gibraltar in May 1886. He joined the battleship  in April 1886 and was put in charge of the experimental department at HMS Excellent in December 1886 before being appointed an assistant to the Director of Naval Ordnance in September 1889.

Promoted to commander on 30 June 1891, Jellicoe joined the battleship  in the Mediterranean Fleet in March 1892. He was then appointed to the new flagship, in October 1893.

Promoted to captain on 1 January 1897, Jellicoe became a member of the Admiralty's Ordnance Committee. He served as Captain of the battleship  and chief of staff to Vice Admiral Sir Edward Seymour during the Seymour Expedition to relieve the legations at Peking during the Boxer Rebellion in June 1900. He was badly wounded during the Battle of Beicang and told he would die but confounded the attending doctor and chaplain by living. He was appointed a Companion of the Order of the Bath and given the German Order of the Red Eagle, 2nd class, with Crossed Swords for services rendered in China. Centurion returned to the United Kingdom in August 1901, and was paid off the following month, when Captain Jellicoe and the crew went on leave. He became Naval Assistant to Third Naval Lord and Controller of the Navy in February 1902 and was given command of the armoured cruiser  on the North America and West Indies Station in August 1903.

Naval career

High command

Promoted to rear admiral on 8 February 1907, he pushed hard for funds to modernise the navy, supporting the construction of new -type battleships and s. He supported F. C. Dreyer's improvements in gunnery fire-control systems, and favoured the adoption of Dreyer's "Fire Control Table", a form of mechanical computer for calculating firing solutions for warships. Jellicoe arranged for the output of naval ordnance to be transferred from the War Office to the Admiralty.

Jellicoe was appointed second-in-command of the Atlantic Fleet in August 1907, hoisting his flag in the battleship . He was appointed Knight Commander of the Royal Victorian Order on the occasion of the King's Review of the Home Fleet in the Solent on 3 August 1907. He went on to be Third Sea Lord and Controller of the Navy in October 1908 and, having taken part in the funeral of King Edward VII in May 1910, he became Commander-in-Chief, Atlantic Fleet in December 1910, hoisting his flag in the battleship . He advanced to Knight Commander of the Order of the Bath on the Coronation of King George V on 19 June 1911 and confirmed in the rank of vice admiral on 18 September 1911. He went on to be Second-in-Command of the Home Fleet, hoisting his flag in the battleship , in December 1911 and, having also been appointed commander of the 2nd Battle Squadron in May 1912, joined the Royal Commission on Fuel and Engines on 1 August 1912. He became Second Sea Lord in December 1912.

First World War

At the start of the First World War, the First Lord of the Admiralty Winston Churchill, removed Admiral George Callaghan, Commander-in-Chief of the Home Fleet (August 1914). Jellicoe was promoted to full admiral on 4 August 1914 and assigned command of the renamed Grand Fleet in Admiral Callaghan's place, though he was appalled by the treatment of his predecessor. He was advanced to Knight Grand Cross of the Order of the Bath on 8 February 1915.

When Fisher (First Sea Lord) and Churchill (First Lord of the Admiralty) both had to leave office (May 1915) after their quarrel over the Dardanelles, Jellicoe wrote to Fisher: "We owe you a debt of gratitude for having saved the Navy from a continuance in office of Mr Churchill, and I hope that never again will any politician be allowed to usurp the functions that he took upon himself to exercise".

Jellicoe commanded the British Grand Fleet at the Battle of Jutland in May 1916, the largest (and only major) clash of dreadnoughts, albeit an indecisive one. His handling of the Grand Fleet during the battle remains controversial, with some historians characterising Jellicoe as too cautious and other historians faulting the battlecruiser commander, Admiral David Beatty, for making various tactical errors. Jellicoe certainly made no significant mistakes during the battle: based on limited intelligence, he correctly deployed the Grand Fleet with a turn to port so as to "cross the T" of the German High Seas Fleet as it appeared. After suffering heavy damage from shells, the German fleet turned 180 degrees and headed away from the battle. At the time the British public expressed disappointment that the Royal Navy had not won a victory on the scale of the 1805 Battle of Trafalgar. Churchill described Jellicoe later as "the only man on either side who could lose the war in an afternoon"—essentially hinting that Jellicoe's decision to prefer caution was strategically correct. He was appointed a member of the Order of Merit on 31 May 1916, advanced to Knight Grand Cross of the Royal Victorian Order on 17 June 1916 and awarded the Grand Cross of the French Legion of Honour on 15 September 1916.

First Sea Lord

Jellicoe was appointed First Sea Lord in November 1916. His term of office saw Britain brought within danger of starvation by German unrestricted U-Boat warfare.

At the War Committee (a Cabinet Committee which discussed strategy in 1915–16) in November 1916, the admirals present, including Jellicoe, told Lloyd George that convoys presented too large a target for enemy ships, and that merchant ship masters lacked the discipline to "keep station" in a convoy. In February 1917, Maurice Hankey wrote a memorandum for Lloyd George calling for the introduction of "scientifically organised convoys", almost certainly after being persuaded by Commander Henderson and the Shipping Ministry officials with whom he was in contact. After a breakfast meeting (13 February 1917) with Lloyd George, Carson (First Lord of the Admiralty) and Admirals Jellicoe and Duff agreed to "conduct experiments". However, convoys were not in general use until August 1917, by which time shipping losses to U-boats were already falling from their April peak.

Jellicoe continued to take a pessimistic view, advising the War Policy Committee (a Cabinet Committee which discussed strategy in 1917) during planning meetings for the Third Ypres Offensive in June and July that nothing could be done to defeat the U-boats. However, removing Jellicoe in July, as Lloyd George wanted, would have been politically impossible given Conservative anger at the return of Churchill (still blamed for the Dardanelles) to office as Minister of Munitions. In August and September Lloyd George was preoccupied with Third Ypres and the possible transfer of resources to Italy, whilst the new First Lord of the Admiralty, Sir Eric Campbell Geddes, was reforming the Naval Staff (including creating a post for Wemyss as Deputy First Sea Lord). Geddes and Lloyd George met with Balfour and Carson (both former First Lords of the Admiralty) on 26 October to discuss sacking Jellicoe after he had failed to act on "secret, but absolutely reliable" information about a German attack on a Norwegian convoy, but again nothing came of this as Lloyd George was soon preoccupied by the Battle of Caporetto and the setting up of the Supreme War Council. Geddes wanted to return to his previous job in charge of military transportation in France, and by December it was clear that Lloyd George would have to sack Jellicoe or lose Geddes.

Jellicoe was rather abruptly dismissed by Geddes in December 1917. Before he left for leave on Christmas Eve he received a letter from Geddes demanding his resignation. Geddes' letter stated that he was still in the building and available to talk, but after consulting Admiral Halsey Jellicoe replied in writing that he would "do what was best for the service". The move became public knowledge two days later.

The Christmas holiday, when Parliament was not sitting, provided a good opportunity to remove Jellicoe with a minimum of fuss. Geddes squared matters with the King and with the Grand Fleet commander Admiral Beatty (who had initially written to Jellicoe of his "dismay" over his sacking and promised to speak to Geddes, but then did not write to him again for a month) over the holiday. The other Sea Lords talked of resigning (although Jellicoe advised them not to do so), especially when Geddes suggested in a meeting (31 December) that Balfour and Carson had specifically recommended Jellicoe's removal at the 26 October meeting; they had not done so, although Balfour's denial was less than emphatic. There was no trouble from the generals, who had a low opinion of Jellicoe. In the end the Sea Lords remained in place, whilst Carson remained a member of the War Cabinet, resigning in January over Irish Home Rule.

Although it was pretended that the decision had been Geddes' alone, he let slip in the Naval Estimates debate (6 March 1918) that he had been conveying "the decision of the Government", i.e. of Lloyd George, who had never put the matter to the War Cabinet. MPs picked up on his slip immediately, and Bonar Law (Conservative Leader) admitted in the same debate that he too had had prior knowledge.

As First Sea Lord Jellicoe was awarded the Grand Cordon of the Belgian Order of Leopold on 21 April 1917, the Russian Order of St. George, 3rd Class on 5 June 1917, the Grand Cross of the Italian Military Order of Savoy on 11 August 1917 and the Grand Cordon of the Japanese Order of the Rising Sun on 29 August 1917.

Later life

After war 

Jellicoe was created Viscount Jellicoe of Scapa Flow on 7 March 1918.

At the Supreme War Council at the start of June 1918, amidst concerns that—following the Treaty of Brest-Litovsk—the Germans were about to requisition the Russian Black Sea Fleet, Lloyd George proposed Jellicoe as Allied Supreme Naval Commander in the Mediterranean. The French were in favour of a combined Allied naval command, but the Italians were not, so nothing came of the suggestion.

Jellicoe was promoted to Admiral of the Fleet on 3 April 1919. He became Governor-General of New Zealand in September 1920 and while there also served as Grand Master of New Zealand's Masonic Grand Lodge. Following his return to England, he was created Earl Jellicoe and Viscount Brocas of Southampton in the County of Southampton on 1 July 1925. He was made a Deputy Lieutenant of Hampshire in 1932. He died of pneumonia at his home in Kensington in London on 20 November 1935 and was buried in St Paul's Cathedral.

Legacy
In 1919, "Sleep, beneath the wave! a requiem" with words by Rev. Alfred Hall and Music by Albert Ham was "Dedicated to Admiral Viscount Jellicoe."

The attempt of his official biographer, Admiral Reginald Bacon, to portray him as the conqueror of the U-Boats is, in John Grigg's view, absurd, as the main decisions were taken by other men. Bacon also claimed that his elevation to a viscountcy on dismissal was a deliberate snub, but in fact Sir John French, the former Commander-in-Chief of the BEF, was only a viscount at the time (both he and Jellicoe became Earls subsequently), whilst Fisher was never more than a Baron. Bacon's neutrality may be questionable as he had himself been sacked by Geddes from command of the Dover Patrol, replaced by Roger Keyes, shortly after Jellicoe's removal.

Family
Jellicoe married, at Holy Trinity Church, Sloane Street, on 1 July 1902, Florence Gwendoline Cayzer, daughter of the shipping magnate Sir Charles Cayzer. His brother, Rev. Frederick Jellicoe (1858–1927), conducted the service. Lord and Lady Jellicoe had a son and five daughters. His son George Jellicoe, 2nd Earl Jellicoe had a military career during the Second World War, after which he was a parliamentarian and a businessman.

Honours
Ribbon bar (incomplete)

Peerages
 Viscount Jellicoe, of Scapa in the County of Orkney – 7 March 1918
 Earl Jellicoe and Viscount Brocas, of Southampton in the County of Southampton – 1 July 1925

British orders
 Knight Grand Cross of the Order of the Bath (GCB) – 8 February 1915 (KCB: 19 June 1911; CB: 9 November 1900)
 Order of Merit (OM) – 31 May 1916
 Knight Grand Cross of the Royal Victorian Order (GCVO) – 17 June 1916 (KCVO: 3 August 1907; CVO: 13 February 1906)

British decoration
 Sea Gallantry Medal (SGM) – 1886

British medals
 Egypt Medal
 China War Medal (1900)
 1914-15 Star
 British War Medal
 World War I Victory Medal
 King George V Coronation Medal
 King George V Silver Jubilee Medal

International orders
  : Order of the Red Eagle, 2nd class with crossed swords – April 1902
  : Grand Cross of the Legion of Honour – 15 September 1916
  : Grand Cordon of the Order of Leopold – 21 April 1917 
  : Order of St. George, 3rd Class – 5 June 1917 
  : Grand Cross of the Military Order of Savoy – 11 August 1917 
  : Grand Cordon of the Order of the Paulownia Flowers – 29 August 1917

International decorations
 Navy Distinguished Service Medal of the United States – 16 September 1919
 Croix de Guerre of France – 21 February 1919
 Belgian Croix de Guerre – 21 April 1917
 Khedive's Star of Egypt – 1882

Arms

References

Sources

Further reading

External links

 
 , note the chapters to the right
 
 
 
 

|-

|-

|-

|-

|-

First Sea Lords and Chiefs of the Naval Staff
Lords of the Admiralty
Royal Navy admirals of the fleet
Royal Navy personnel of the Anglo-Egyptian War
Royal Navy admirals of World War I
Governors-General of New Zealand
Members of the Order of Merit
Earls Jellicoe
Burials at St Paul's Cathedral
Knights Grand Cross of the Order of the Bath
Knights Grand Cross of the Royal Victorian Order
Recipients of the Order of St. George of the Third Degree
Deputy Lieutenants of Hampshire
1859 births
1935 deaths
Deaths from pneumonia in England
Cayzer family
Royal Navy personnel of the Boxer Rebellion
Foreign recipients of the Distinguished Service Medal (United States)
New Zealand Freemasons
Freemasons of the United Grand Lodge of England
Recipients of the Sea Gallantry Medal
Recipients of the Navy Distinguished Service Medal
Viscounts created by George V
Military personnel from Southampton